The Bodie Hills are a low mountain range in Mono County, California, in the United States. The Bodie Hills are between Bridgeport and the Nevada border, where they become the Bodie Mountains in Mineral County, Nevada. The Sierra Nevada lies to the west. The mining district and town of Bodie, California, is located in the Bodie Hills.

Early Native American peoples of the Mono tribe and Northern Paiute people inhabited this locale and engaged in trade with distant coastal tribes such as the Chumash in Southern California.

Bodie State Historic Park

The ghost town of Bodie is now located in Bodie State Historic Park. The preserved California mining district is also designated a National Historic Landmark and  a California Historical Landmark. It became a California State Historic Park in 1962 and was opened to the public.

See also
List of ghost towns in California
List of ghost towns in Nevada

References

External links 

 Bodie Hills Conservation Partnership

Mountain ranges of Northern California
Mountain ranges of the Great Basin
Mountain ranges of Mono County, California
Landforms of Mineral County, Nevada